Mavros Volakas is a large rock, next to Long Beach, on the coast of Crete, near Lambi, in Rethymno regional unit.

There is another large rock that is even closer to the beach, called Aspros Volakas.

See also
List of islands of Greece

References

Landforms of Rethymno (regional unit)
Uninhabited islands of Crete
Islands of Greece